John Skelton (1925 Co. Armagh – 2009) was an Irish artist.

Biography
He started his professional career in London, where he came under influence of Euston Road School in the late 1940s.
In 1946 he married Caroline, settling four years later in Dublin. He worked initially in advertising as Art Director and illustrator of books, most of them educational. After 1975 he worked full-time as a painter. He had numerous one man shows in Dublin; two in Belfast, one in Los Angeles and one in the Mystic Seaport Museum in Connecticut.

Up to the late 1980s, Skelton was a frequent exhibitor in group shows, particularly the annual Royal Hibernian Academy and the Watercolour Society shows in Dublin. In recent years, however, his work was in such demand that he contributed to these less often. During the 1970s and earlier 1980s he earned a reputation as a gifted teacher and lecturer in the National College of Art and Design in Dublin.

John Skelton's grave can be found at Mount Jerome Cemetery, Harold's Cross, Dublin, Ireland.

Education
 Queens University, Belfast, Northern Ireland
 Belfast College of Art, Belfast, Northern Ireland
 St. Martins School of Art, London, United Kingdom

Selected Public Collections
 ESB Bank of Ireland
 Embassy of Korea
 Woodchester now GE Capital
 Joyce Society of Northwestern University, Illinois.

References

1925 births
2009 deaths

Irish painters
Burials at Mount Jerome Cemetery and Crematorium
Alumni of Queen's University Belfast
Alumni of Saint Martin's School of Art